Melly, Mely or Mellie can refer to:

Surname 
Andrée Melly (born 1932-2020), English actress
Charles Pierre Melly (1829–1888), English philanthropist
George Melly (1926–2007), English singer, critic, writer and lecturer
George Melly (MP) (1830–1894), English merchant, shipowner and politician 
Julius Kibiwott Melly, elected to the National Assembly of Kenya in 2013

Given name, nickname or stage name 
Mellie Francon (born 1982), Swiss snowboarder
Melly Goeslaw (born 1974), stage name of Indonesian singer and songwriter Mellyana Goeslaw Hoed
Melly Oitzl (born 1955), Austrian behavioral neuroscientist
Mely Romero Celis (born 1977), Mexican politician
Melly Still (born 1962), British director, designer and choreographer
Mely G. Tan (born 1930), Chinese Indonesian sociologist
Mellie Uyldert (1908–2009), Dutch New Age writer, alternative healer, occultist and astrologer
Melisa Nicolau (born 1984), Spanish former footballer known as Mely or Melisa
Meldon Mellie Wolfgang (1890-1947), American Major League Baseball pitcher
YNW Melly (born 1999), American rapper

Fictional characters 
Melanie Hamilton, called "Melly", in the film Gone with the Wind
Melly Plinius, a survivor in the video game Identity V
Roger Mellie, in Viz magazine

Feminine given names